NewsKnowledge is a commercial news aggregator providing full text news articles and headline news feeds for web sites and digital signage. NewsKnowledge was founded in 1996 and is based in Zürich, primarily providing commercial products for web syndication. It is the owner of NewsIsFree.com, a free news feed directory and search engine.

Their headline news products search and retrieve news headlines from more than 22,000 sources from around the world. NewsKnowledge offers up to 150,000 breaking news stories a day, dynamically hyperlinked to company, financial, and industry data.

See also 
 Web syndication
 News aggregator
 RSS (file format)

External links
 NewsKnowledge Website
 News Is Free Website 

1996 establishments in Switzerland
News aggregators
Online databases
Open-source intelligence